Österdahl is a Swedish surname literally translating to "eastern valley". Notable people with the surname include:

Bror Österdahl (1900–1973), Swedish sprinter
Maire Österdahl (1927–2013), Finnish sprinter
Marcus Österdahl (born 1943), Swedish musician and record producer
Martin Österdahl (born 1973), Swedish author and television producer

Surnames of Scandinavian origin